The 2019–20 Boston Celtics season was the 74th season of the franchise in the National Basketball Association (NBA). This was the team's seventh season under head coach Brad Stevens. 

After losing Kyrie Irving and Al Horford to free agency, the Celtics signed former Charlotte Hornets All-Star Kemba Walker and former New York Knicks and Portland Trail Blazers center Enes Kanter in the offseason. The season was suspended by league officials following the games of March 11 due to the COVID-19 pandemic. On March 19, Marcus Smart announced that he tested positive for COVID-19.

On June 4, the Celtics were one of 22 teams invited to the NBA Bubble. In the first round of the NBA playoffs, the Celtics defeated the No. 6 seeded Philadelphia 76ers in four games. The team defeated the No. 2 seeded and NBA champion Toronto Raptors in seven games in the Eastern Conference Semifinals. However, the Celtics lost to the fifth-seeded Miami Heat in the Eastern Conference Finals in six games.

Draft picks

The Boston Celtics hold 3 first round picks and a second round pick for the 2019 NBA Draft. The 14th pick was transferred from the Sacramento Kings as it failed to reach the 1st pick.

Roster

Standings

Division

Conference

Game log

Preseason

|- style="background:#cfc"
| 1
| October 6
| Charlotte
| 
| Jayson Tatum (20)
| Grant Williams (9)
| Kemba Walker (4)
| TD Garden18,624
| 1–0
|- style="background:#cfc"
| 2
| October 11
| @ Orlando
| 
| Jayson Tatum (15)
| Daniel Theis (9)
| Wanamaker, Smart (4)
| Amway Center17,354
| 2–0
|- style="background:#cfc"
| 3
| October 13
| Cleveland
| 
| Max Strus (14)
| Jayson Tatum (9)
| Tremont Waters (4)
| TD Garden18,624
| 3–0
|- style="background:#cfc"
| 4
| October 15
| @ Cleveland
| 
| Carsen Edwards (30)
| Javonte Green (9)
| Tremont Waters (7)
| Rocket Mortgage FieldHouse12,398
| 4–0

Regular season

|- style="background:#fcc;"
| 1
| October 23
| @ Philadelphia
| 
| Gordon Hayward (25)
| Jayson Tatum (10)
| Marcus Smart (6)
| Wells Fargo Center20,422
| 0–1
|- style="background:#cfc;"
| 2
| October 25
| Toronto
| 
| Tatum, Brown (25)
| Tatum, Brown (9)
| Tatum, Brown, G.Williams (4)
| TD Garden18,624
| 1–1
|- style="background:#cfc;"
| 3
| October 26
| @ New York
| 
| Kemba Walker (32)
| Jayson Tatum (9)
| Smart, Walker (4)
| Madison Square Garden19,812
| 2–1
|- style="background:#cfc;"
| 4
| October 30
| Milwaukee
| 
| Kemba Walker (32)
| Gordon Hayward (10)
| Gordon Hayward (7)
| TD Garden18,624
| 3–1

|- style="background:#cfc;"
| 5
| November 1
| New York
| 
| Kemba Walker (33)
| Gordon Hayward (9)
| Kemba Walker (5)
| TD Garden18,624
| 4–1
|- style="background:#cfc;"
| 6
| November 5
| @ Cleveland
| 
| Gordon Hayward (39)
| Daniel Theis (9)
| Gordon Hayward (8)
| Rocket Mortgage FieldHouse17,709
| 5–1
|- style="background:#cfc;"
| 7
| November 7
| @ Charlotte
| 
| Jayson Tatum (23)
| Gordon Hayward (10)
| Hayward, Walker (6)
| Spectrum Center18,487
| 6–1
|- style="background:#cfc;"
| 8
| November 9
| @ San Antonio
| 
| Jaylen Brown (30)
| Tatum, Brown, Williams III (7)
| Kemba Walker (8)
| AT&T Center18,354
| 7–1
|- style="background:#cfc;"
| 9
| November 11
| Dallas
| 
| Kemba Walker (29)
| Jaylen Brown (11)
| Marcus Smart (6)
| TD Garden18,624
| 8–1
|- style="background:#cfc;"
| 10
| November 13
| Washington
| 
| Kemba Walker (25)
| Enes Kanter (9)
| Smart, Walker, Wanamaker (5)
| TD Garden19,156
| 9–1
|- style="background:#cfc;"
| 11
| November 15
| @ Golden State
| 
| Jayson Tatum (24)
| Brown, Tatum (8)
| Kemba Walker (5)
| Chase Center18,064
| 10–1
|- style="background:#fcc;"
| 12
| November 17
| @ Sacramento
| 
| Jaylen Brown (18)
| Daniel Theis (10)
| Smart, Walker (9)
| Golden 1 Center16,633
| 10–2
|- style="background:#cfc;"
| 13
| November 18
| @ Phoenix
| 
| Jayson Tatum (26)
| Theis, Tatum (11)
| Brad Wanamaker (6)
| Talking Stick Resort Arena15,193
| 11–2
|- style="background:#fcc;"
| 14
| November 20
| @ L. A. Clippers
| 
| Jayson Tatum (30)
| Daniel Theis (14)
| Marcus Smart (8)
| Staples Center19,068
| 11–3
|- style="background:#fcc;"
| 15
| November 22
| @ Denver
| 
| Jaylen Brown (22)
| Jaylen Brown (10)
| Brown, Wanamaker (4)
| Pepsi Center19,520
| 11–4
|- style="background:#cfc;"
| 16
| November 25
| Sacramento
| 
| Jaylen Brown (24)
| Enes Kanter (9)
| Marcus Smart (7)
| TD Garden19,156
| 12–4
|- style="background:#cfc;"
| 17
| November 27
| Brooklyn
| 
| Kemba Walker (39)
| Jaylen Brown (10)
| Smart, Tatum (5)
| TD Garden19,156
| 13–4
|- style="background:#fcc;"
| 18
| November 29
| @ Brooklyn
| 
| Jayson Tatum (26)
| Jayson Tatum (9)
| Kemba Walker (6)
| Barclays Center17,732
| 13–5

|- style="background:#cfc;"
| 19
| December 1
| @ New York
| 
| Jayson Tatum (30)
| Enes Kanter (11)
| Kemba Walker (10)
| Madison Square Garden18,005
| 14–5
|- style="background:#cfc;"
| 20
| December 4
| Miami
| 
| Jaylen Brown (31)
| Robert Williams III (10)
| Kemba Walker (7)
| TD Garden19,156
| 15–5
|- style="background:#cfc;"
| 21
| December 6
| Denver
| 
| Jayson Tatum (26)
| Brown, Tatum (7)
| Jayson Tatum (5)
| TD Garden19,156
| 16–5
|- style="background:#cfc;"
| 22
| December 9
| Cleveland
| 
| Kemba Walker (22)
| Jayson Tatum (11)
| Kemba Walker (7)
| TD Garden19,156
| 17–5
|- style="background:#fcc;"
| 23
| December 11
| @ Indiana
| 
| Kemba Walker (44)
| Jaylen Brown (8)
| Jaylen Brown (8)
| Bankers Life Fieldhouse15,637
| 17–6
|- style="background:#fcc;"
| 24
| December 12
| Philadelphia
| 
| Kemba Walker (29)
| Enes Kanter (9)
| Kemba Walker (8)
| TD Garden19,156
| 17–7
|- style="background:#cfc;"
| 25
| December 18
| @ Dallas
| 
| Kemba Walker (32)
| Enes Kanter (13)
| Kemba Walker (3)
| American Airlines Center20,181
| 18–7
|- style="background:#cfc;"
| 26
| December 20
| Detroit
| 
| Brown, Tatum (26)
| Enes Kanter (18)
| Kemba Walker (11)
| TD Garden19,156
| 19–7
|- style="background:#cfc;"
| 27
| December 22
| Charlotte
| 
| Jayson Tatum (39)
| Enes Kanter (13)
| Brad Wanamaker (8)
| TD Garden19,156
| 20–7
|- style="background:#cfc;"
| 28
| December 25
| @ Toronto
| 
| Jaylen Brown (30)
| Enes Kanter (11)
| Hayward, Tatum (6)
| Scotiabank Arena19,800
| 21–7
|- style="background:#cfc;"
| 29
| December 27
| Cleveland
| 
| Jaylen Brown (34)
| Brown, Kanter (9)
| Gordon Hayward (8)
| TD Garden19,156
| 22–7
|- style="background:#fcc;"
| 30
| December 28
| Toronto
| 
| Kemba Walker (30)
| Hayward, Kanter (6)
| Jayson Tatum (4)
| TD Garden19,156
| 22–8
|- style="background:#cfc;"
| 31
| December 31
| @ Charlotte
| 
| Jayson Tatum (24)
| Enes Kanter (14)
| Smart, Walker (7)
| Spectrum Center19,216
| 23–8

|- style="background:#cfc;"
| 32
| January 3
| Atlanta
| 
| Jaylen Brown (24)
| Enes Kanter (11)
| Marcus Smart (9)
| TD Garden19,156
| 24–8
|- style="background:#cfc;"
| 33
| January 4
| @ Chicago
| 
| Jayson Tatum (28)
| Enes Kanter (12)
| Smart, Wanamaker (5)
| United Center21,130
| 25–8
|- style="background:#fcc;"
| 34
| January 6
| @ Washington
| 
| Jaylen Brown (23)
| Jaylen Brown (12)
| Gordon Hayward (4)
| Capital One Arena17,963
| 25–9
|- style="background:#fcc;"
| 35
| January 8
| San Antonio
| 
| Gordon Hayward (18)
| Enes Kanter (7)
| Marcus Smart (5)
| TD Garden19,156
| 25–10
|- style="background:#fcc;"
| 36
| January 9
| @ Philadelphia
| 
| Kemba Walker (26)
| Enes Kanter (11)
| Jayson Tatum (4)
| Wells Fargo Center20,822
| 25–11
|- style="background:#cfc;"
| 37
| January 11
| New Orleans
| 
| Jayson Tatum (41)
| Enes Kanter (19)
| Kemba Walker (7)
| TD Garden19,156
| 26–11
|- style="background:#cfc;"
| 38
| January 13
| Chicago
| 
| Jayson Tatum (21)
| Enes Kanter (9)
| Hayward, Smart (8)
| TD Garden19,156
| 27–11
|- style="background:#fcc;"
| 39
| January 15
| Detroit
| 
| Gordon Hayward (25)
| Jaylen Brown (12)
| Daniel Theis (6)
| TD Garden19,156
| 27–12
|- style="background:#fcc;"
| 40
| January 16
| @ Milwaukee
| 
| Kemba Walker (40)
| Kemba Walker (11)
| Brad Wanamaker (4)
| Fiserv Forum17,873
| 27–13
|- style="background:#fcc;"
| 41
| January 18
| Phoenix
| 
| Marcus Smart (37)
| Jayson Tatum (10)
| Marcus Smart (8)
| TD Garden19,156
| 27–14
|- style="background:#cfc;"
| 42
| January 20
| L. A. Lakers
| 
| Jayson Tatum (27)
| Enes Kanter (11)
| Kemba Walker (7)
| TD Garden19,156
| 28–14
|- style="background:#cfc;"
| 43
| January 22
| Memphis
| 
| Jayson Tatum (23)
| Enes Kanter (8)
| Marcus Smart (6)
| TD Garden19,156
| 29–14
|- style="background:#cfc;"
| 44
| January 24
| @ Orlando
| 
| Kemba Walker (37)
| Gordon Hayward (14)
| Smart, Walker (6)
| Amway Center 18,846
| 30–14
|- style="background:#fcc;"
| 45
| January 26
| @ New Orleans
| 
| Kemba Walker (35)
| Daniel Theis (9)
| Marcus Smart (7)
| Smoothie King Center16,737
| 30–15
|- style="background:#cfc;"
| 46
| January 28
| @ Miami
| 
| Gordon Hayward (29)
| Daniel Theis (11)
| Kemba Walker (8)
| American Airlines Arena19,704
| 31–15
|- style="background:#cfc;"
| 47
| January 30
| Golden State
| 
| Gordon Hayward (25)
| Hayward, Theis (8)
| Marcus Smart (6)
| TD Garden19,156
| 32–15

|- style="background:#cfc;"
| 48
| February 1
| Philadelphia
| 
| Jaylen Brown (32)
| Brown, Hayward (9)
| Smart, Tatum (4)
| TD Garden19,156
| 33–15
|- style="background:#cfc;"
| 49
| February 3
| @ Atlanta
| 
| Jayson Tatum (28)
| Enes Kanter (9)
| Gordon Hayward (6)
| State Farm Arena16,231
| 34–15
|- style="background:#cfc;"
| 50
| February 5
| Orlando
| 
| Jayson Tatum (33)
| Kanter, Tatum (8)
| Gordon Hayward (7)
| TD Garden19,156
| 35–15
|- style="background:#cfc;"
| 51
| February 7
| Atlanta
| 
| Jayson Tatum (32)
| Enes Kanter (15)
| Smart, Tatum, Walker (6)
| TD Garden19,156
| 36–15
|- style="background:#cfc;"
| 52
| February 9
| @ Oklahoma City
| 
| Kemba Walker (27)
| Tatum, Theis (11)
| Daniel Theis (5)
| Chesapeake Energy Arena18,203
| 37–15
|- style="background:#fcc;"
| 53
| February 11
| @ Houston
| 
| Gordon Hayward (20)
| Tatum, Theis (9)
| Gordon Hayward (6)
| Toyota Center18,055
| 37–16
|- style="background:#cfc;"
| 54
| February 13
| L. A. Clippers
| 
| Jayson Tatum (39)
| Gordon Hayward (13)
| Kemba Walker (7)
| TD Garden19,156
| 38–16
|- align="center"
| colspan="9" style="background:#bbcaff;" | All-Star Break
|- style="background:#cfc;"
| 55
| February 21
| @ Minnesota
| 
| Gordon Hayward (29)
| Daniel Theis (16)
| Marcus Smart (10)
| Target Center18,978
| 39–16
|- style="background:#fcc;"
| 56
| February 23
| @ L. A. Lakers
| 
| Jayson Tatum (41)
| Daniel Theis (9)
| Gordon Hayward (9)
| Staples Center18,997
| 39–17
|- style="background:#cfc;"
| 57
| February 25
| @ Portland
| 
| Jayson Tatum (36)
| Daniel Theis (9)
| Brad Wanamaker (4)
| Moda Center19,460
| 40–17
|- style="background:#cfc;"
| 58
| February 26
| @ Utah
| 
| Jayson Tatum (33)
| Jayson Tatum (11)
| Marcus Smart (9)
| Vivint Smart Home Arena18,306
| 41–17
|- style="background:#fcc;"
| 59
| February 29
| Houston
| 
| Jayson Tatum (32)
| Daniel Theis (15)
| Marcus Smart (7)
| TD Garden19,156
| 41–18

|- style="background:#fcc;"
| 60
| March 3
| Brooklyn
| 
| Jaylen Brown (22)
| Javonte Green (8)
| Marcus Smart (10)
| TD Garden19,156
| 41–19
|- style="background:#cfc;"
| 61
| March 4
| @ Cleveland
| 
| Jayson Tatum (32)
| Enes Kanter (11)
| Jayson Tatum (6)
| Rocket Mortgage FieldHouse16,897
| 42–19
|- style="background:#fcc;"
| 62
| March 6
| Utah
| 
| Marcus Smart (29)
| Daniel Theis (9)
| Kemba Walker (7)
| TD Garden19,156
| 42–20
|- style="background:#fcc;"
| 63
| March 8
| Oklahoma City
| 
| Gordon Hayward (24)
| Marcus Smart (10)
| Kemba Walker (5)
| TD Garden19,156
| 42–21
|- style="background:#cfc;"
| 64
| March 10
| @ Indiana
| 
| Jayson Tatum (30)
| Gordon Hayward (10)
| Hayward, Smart (5)
| Bankers Life Fieldhouse17,053
| 43–21

|- style="background:#fcc;"
| 65
| July 31
| @ Milwaukee
| 
| Marcus Smart (23)
| Daniel Theis (12)
| Gordon Hayward (6)
| HP Field HouseNo In-Person Attendance
| 43–22
|- style="background:#cfc;"
| 66
| August 2
| Portland
| 
| Jayson Tatum (34)
| Hayward, Kanter (8)
| Jayson Tatum (8)
| The ArenaNo In-Person Attendance
| 44–22
|- style="background:#fcc;"
| 67
| August 4
| @ Miami
| 
| Jayson Tatum (23)
| Jaylen Brown (10)
| Kemba Walker (4)
| HP Field HouseNo In-Person Attendance
| 44–23
|- style="background:#cfc;"
| 68
| August 5
| Brooklyn
| 
| Jaylen Brown (21)
| Gordon Hayward (7)
| Marcus Smart (6)
| The ArenaNo In-Person Attendance
| 45–23
|- style="background:#cfc;"
| 69
| August 7
| @ Toronto
| 
| Jaylen Brown (20)
| Daniel Theis (11)
| Marcus Smart (5)
| The ArenaNo In-Person Attendance
| 46–23
|- style="background:#cfc;"
| 70
| August 9
| Orlando
| 
| Gordon Hayward (31)
| Jaylen Brown (12)
| Marcus Smart (9)
| The ArenaNo In-Person Attendance
| 47–23
|- style="background:#cfc;"
| 71
| August 11
| @ Memphis
| 
| Jayson Tatum (29)
| Enes Kanter (8)
| Marcus Smart (9)
| HP Field HouseNo In-Person Attendance
| 48–23
|- style="background:#fcc;"
| 72
| August 13
| Washington
| 
| Javonte Green (23)
| Vincent Poirier (9)
| Langford, Wanamaker, Waters (4)
| The ArenaNo In-Person Attendance
| 48–24

|- style="background:#;"
| 65
| March 12
| @ Milwaukee
| 
| 
| 
| 
| Fiserv Forum
| 
|- style="background:#;"
| 66
| March 13
| Washington
| 
| 
| 
| 
| TD Garden
| 
|- style="background:#;"
| 67
| March 15
| @ Chicago
| 
| 
| 
| 
| United Center
| 
|- style="background:#;"
| 68
| March 18
| New York
| 
| 
| 
| 
| TD Garden
| 
|- style="background:#;"
| 69
| March 20
| @ Toronto
| 
| 
| 
| 
| Scotiabank Arena
| 
|- style="background:#;"
| 70
| March 21
| @ Brooklyn
| 
| 
| 
| 
| Barclays Center
| 
|- style="background:#;"
| 71
| March 23
| @ Washington
| 
| 
| 
| 
| Capital One Arena
| 
|- style="background:#;"
| 72
| March 25
| @ Memphis
| 
| 
| 
| 
| FedExForum
| 
|- style="background:#;"
| 73
| March 27
| Portland
| 
| 
| 
| 
| TD Garden
| 
|- style="background:#;"
| 74
| March 29
| Minnesota
| 
| 
| 
| 
| TD Garden
| 
|- style="background:#;"
| 75
| April 1
| Miami
| 
| 
| 
| 
| TD Garden
| 
|- style="background:#;"
| 76
| April 3
| Orlando
| 
| 
| 
| 
| TD Garden
| 
|- style="background:#;"
| 77
| April 5
| Milwaukee
| 
| 
| 
| 
| TD Garden
| 
|- style="background:#;"
| 78
| April 8
| Indiana
| 
| 
| 
| 
| TD Garden
| 
|- style="background:#;"
| 79
| April 10
| @ Orlando
| 
| 
| 
| 
| Amway Center
| 
|- style="background:#;"
| 80
| April 11
| @ Miami
| 
| 
| 
| 
| American Airlines Arena
| 
|- style="background:#;"
| 81
| April 13
| @ Detroit
| 
| 
| 
| 
| Little Caesars Arena
| 
|- style="background:#;"
| 82
| April 15
| Chicago
| 
| 
| 
| 
| TD Garden
|

Playoffs

|- style="background:#cfc;"
| 1
| August 17
| Philadelphia
| 
| Jayson Tatum (32)
| Jayson Tatum (13)
| Kemba Walker (5)
| HP Field HouseNo in-person attendance
| 1–0
|- style="background:#cfc;"
| 2
| August 19
| Philadelphia
| 
| Jayson Tatum (33)
| Enes Kanter (9)
| Jayson Tatum (5)
| HP Field HouseNo in-person attendance
| 2–0
|- style="background:#cfc;"
| 3
| August 21
| @ Philadelphia
| 
| Kemba Walker (24)
| Smart, Walker (8)
| Kemba Walker (4)
| HP Field HouseNo in-person attendance
| 3–0
|- style="background:#cfc;"
| 4
| August 23
| @ Philadelphia
| 
| Kemba Walker (32)
| Jayson Tatum (15)
| Smart, Tatum, Walker (4)
| HP Field HouseNo in-person attendance
| 4–0

|- style="background:#cfc;"
| 1
| August 30
| @ Toronto
| 
| Smart, Tatum (21)
| Daniel Theis (15)
| Kemba Walker (10)
| HP Field HouseNo in-person attendance
| 1–0
|- style="background:#cfc;"
| 2
| September 1
| @ Toronto
| 
| Jayson Tatum (34)
| Daniel Theis (9)
| Jayson Tatum (6)
| HP Field HouseNo in-person attendance
| 2–0
|- style="background:#fcc;"
| 3
| September 3
| Toronto
| 
| Kemba Walker (29)
| Jaylen Brown (12)
| Jayson Tatum (6)
| HP Field HouseNo in-person attendance
| 2–1
|- style="background:#fcc;"
| 4
| September 5
| Toronto
| 
| Jayson Tatum (24)
| Jayson Tatum (10)
| Kemba Walker (8)
| HP Field HouseNo in-person attendance
| 2–2
|- style="background:#cfc;"
| 5
| September 7
| @ Toronto
| 
| Jaylen Brown (27)
| Jayson Tatum (10)
| Kemba Walker (7)
| HP Field HouseNo in-person attendance
| 3–2
|- style="background:#fcc;"
| 6
| September 9
| Toronto
| 
| Jaylen Brown (31)
| Jaylen Brown (16)
| Marcus Smart (10)
| HP Field HouseNo in-person attendance
| 3–3
|- style="background:#cfc;"
| 7
| September 11
| @ Toronto
| 
| Jayson Tatum (29)
| Jayson Tatum (12)
| Jayson Tatum (7)
| AdventHealth ArenaNo in-person attendance
| 4–3

|- style="background:#fcc;"
| 1
| September 15
| Miami
| 
| Jayson Tatum (30)
| Jayson Tatum (14)
| Walker, Wanamaker (6)
| HP Field HouseNo in-person attendance
| 0–1
|- style="background:#fcc;"
| 2
| September 17
| Miami
| 
| Kemba Walker (23)
| Daniel Theis (8)
| Smart, Tatum (4)
| AdventHealth ArenaNo in-person attendance
| 0–2
|- style="background:#cfc;"
| 3
| September 19
| @ Miami
| 
| Jaylen Brown (26)
| Jayson Tatum (14)
| Jayson Tatum (8)
| AdventHealth ArenaNo in-person attendance
| 1–2
|- style="background:#fcc;"
| 4
| September 23
| @ Miami
| 
| Jayson Tatum (28)
| Brown, Tatum, Theis (9)
| Marcus Smart (11)
| AdventHealth ArenaNo in-person attendance
| 1–3
|- style="background:#cfc;"
| 5
| September 25
| Miami
| 
| Jayson Tatum (31)
| Daniel Theis (13)
| Marcus Smart (8)
| AdventHealth ArenaNo in-person attendance
| 2–3
|- style="background:#fcc;"
| 6
| September 27
| @ Miami
| 
| Jaylen Brown (26)
| Brown, Smart (8)
| Jayson Tatum (11)
| AdventHealth ArenaNo in-person attendance
| 2–4

Transactions

Trades

Free agency

Re-signed

Additions

Subtractions

References

Boston Celtics seasons
Boston Celtics
Boston Celtics
Boston Celtics
Celtics
Celtics